Dance Mix is the first remix album by Turkish singer Murat Boz. It was released by Dokuz Sekiz Müzik on 14 August 2012, his only remix album to be published by this company. The album features elements of electronic music, and is Boz's first major work since the 2011 release of his third studio album Aşklarım Büyük Benden. The album was produced by Ahmet Çelenk.

Dance Mix contains remixed versions of songs from Boz's 2009 album Şans and his 2011 album Aşklarım Büyük Benden. It also include the remixed version of "Yazmışsa Bozmak Olmaz", performed by Boz for Ozan Doğulu's 2011 album 130 Bpm Allegro and originally found in Kenan Doğulu's 1993 album Yaparım Bilirsin. The album contains nine songs in total. The remixed versions of "Özledim" and "Aşkın Suçu Yok" were made by Gürsel Çelik, "Hayat Öpücüğü" by Ozan Doğulu and Uğur Kirik, "Geri Dönüş Olsa" by Erdem Kınay, and "Kalamam Arkadaş" by Kıvanch K. and Cihat Uğurel.

Two music videos were made for the album, "Özledim (Gurcell Club Mix)" and "Geri Dönüş Olsa (Erdem Kınay Remix)", both of which were directed by Nihat Odabaşı. "Hayat Öpücüğü (Ozinga Mix)" and "Geri Dönüş Olsa (Erdem Kınay Remix)" were both nominated for the Best Remix award at the 2013 Turkey Music Awards. The award was eventually given to "Hayat Öpücüğü (Ozinga Mix)".

Background and release 
After releasing his first studio album, Maximum, Boz continued his career with releasing two more albums: Şans (2009) and Aşklarım Büyük Benden (2011). After releasing a music video for Aşklarım Büyük Bendens lead single, Boz released four more music videos for the songs "Hayat Öpücüğü", "Geri Dönüş Olsa", "Kalamam Arkadaş" and "Bulmaca". The album's last music video, "Soyadımsın", was released in May 2012. Out of these songs, "Geri Dönüş Olsa" and "Kalamam Arkadaş", topped Turkey's official music chart. Boz was among the artists whose name appeared on Ozan Doğulu's album, 130 Bpm Allegro, in August 2011, and recorded the song "Yazmışsa Bozmak Olmaz", initially performed by Kenan Doğulu for his 1993 album Yaparım Bilirsin (1993).

On 11 July 2012, in a post on his Facebook account, Murat Boz wrote "Remixles are coming...". On 19 Jul 2012, it was reported that the countdown for Boz's remix album had begun. On 25 July, it was confirmed that Erdem Kınay, Gürsel Çelik, Kıvanch K, Ozan Çolakoğlu and Uğur Kirik would serve as the album's arrangers. On 1 August 2012, it was announced that the album would be published in the music markets under the title Dance Mix. On 14 August 2012, the album was released by Dokuz Sekiz Müzik.

Content 
Dance Mix features electronic music rhythms and contains nine songs in total. The remixed version of "Özledim", which originally appeared in Şans (2009), was prepared by Gürsel Çelik, and "Hayat Öpücüğü" from Aşklarım Büyük Benden was remixed by Ozan Doğulu and Uğur Kirik. "Aşkın Suçu Yok" was also remixed by Gürsel Çelik, followed by "Geri Dönüş Olsa" by Erdem Kınay, and "Kalamam Arkadaş" by Kıvanch K. and Cihat Uğurel. Aside from these songs, "Yazmışsa Bozmak Olmaz", which Boz had previously performed for Ozan Doğulu's 2011 album 130 Bpm Allegro, was remixed and included in the album.

Two music videos were later made for the songs "Özledim (Gurcell Club Mix)" and "Geri Dönüş Olsa (Erdem Kınay Remix)", both of which were directed by Nihat Odabaşı. The first of these videos was released in September 2012, followed by the other in December 2012. "Hayat Öpücüğü (Ozinga Mix)" and"Geri Dönüş Olsa (Erdem Kınay Remix)" were both nominated for the Best Remix award at the 2012 Turkey Music Awards, the first of which succeeded in receiving the award. Writing for Milliyet Sanat, Yavuz Hakan Tok said that Dance Mix did not meet his expectations and that it wouldn't "add a positive point" to Boz's discography.

Track listing

Personnel 

Dokuz Sekiz Müzik – production
Ahmet Çelenk – producer
Demet Karaduman – production coordinator
Murat Boz – artist
Fettah Can – songwriter, composer
Bülent Ay – composer
Reşit Gözdamla – songwriter, composer
Çişel Onat – songwriter, composer
Deniz Erten – songwriter
Erdem Kınay – composer, arranger
Ayşe Özyılmazel – songwriter, composer
Mert Ekren – composer
Kenan Doğulu – songwriter
Ozan Doğulu – composer, arranger
Gürsel Çelik – arranger
Ozan Çolakoğlu – arranger
Kıvanch K. – arranger, mixing
Uğur Kirik – arranger
Cihat Uğurel – arranger, mixing
Özgür Yurtoğlu – mixing
Suat Durmuş – mixing
Emre Aşkın – mixing
Arzu Alsan – mixing
Çağrı Kodamanoğlu – mixing
Tarık Ceran / Digilog by TC – mastering
Lö Designers – graphic design
Behra Ofset – printing
Eliz Sakuçoğlu – management, pr
Hakan Özgül / Akademi Organizasyon – reservation agency

Credits adapted from Dance Mixs album booklet.

Release history

References

External links 
 Dance Mix – Discogs

2012 remix albums
Murat Boz albums